The Great Float is a body of water on the Wirral Peninsula, England, formed from the natural tidal inlet, the Wallasey Pool. It is split into two large docks, East Float and West Float, both part of the Birkenhead Docks complex.

History

Unlike in Liverpool, where the docks were built along the coastline of the River Mersey, Birkenhead Docks were designed as an inland system by enclosing the tidal inlet of Wallasey Pool. The construction of a cofferdam enabled land reclamation and excavations to take place. After the establishment of the Great Low Water Basin, Morpeth Dock and Egerton Dock, the Great Float was formed between 1851 and 1860 from most of what remained of Wallasey Pool. The plans for its construction were originally shown in 1844 in the Liverpool Standard newspaper. Designed by James Meadows Rendel, protégé of Thomas Telford, the scheme was managed by the Birkenhead Dock Company until a financial crisis in 1847. The docks were taken over by the Liverpool Corporation in 1855. By 1858, the rights to dock ownership and revenues were transferred to the Mersey Docks and Harbour Board, based in Liverpool.

Graving docks were built in 1864 and 1877, on the south side of West Float. Established in 1853, Thomas Brassey's Canada Works was built to the east of the Great Float. The entrance to the Great Float was originally through the Great Low Water Basin, which was enclosed in 1877 as Wallasey Dock. After this date, access from the river was provided via Alfred Dock and Morpeth Dock.

The Resurgam, one of the first submarines, was tested in the Great Float in 1879.

In the early 20th century, Birkenhead Docks became an important flour milling centre, with numerous companies, including Joseph Rank Ltd and Spillers, located on the Great Float's quaysides. In the 1990s, long after the industry had gone into decline, most of these buildings were demolished. Two large warehouses remain, which have now been converted into residential apartments.

The Great Float was the site of the Warship Preservation Trust's exhibits from 2002 until its closure in February 2006.

LCT 7074 Landfall is the last remaining tank landing craft which had served during D-Day. The landing craft was one of the Warship Preservation Trust exhibits and had sunk in East Float following the liquidation of the trust in 2006. The craft was refloated on 16 October 2014.

Docks

The following docks were originally accessible from the Great Float:

In addition, three graving docks existed in the Great Float for ship repairs. Bidston No.3 Dock remains in use as part of the facilities of Cammell Laird Shiprepairers and Shipbuilders Ltd. The other graving docks were filled in during the 1980s.

Quays

East Float

West Float

Bridges

Three road bridges cross the Great Float:

A red girdered bascule bridge at Tower Road connects the Seacombe district of Wallasey with Birkenhead. Known as the Four Bridges, as originally four movable bridges existed along Tower Road: two between the Great Float and Alfred Dock, one between the Great Float and Wallasey Dock and one between the Great Float and Egerton Dock. When originally built, all four were hydraulic swing bridge types. In the 1930s most were replaced by bascule bridges.

Joining the southern end of the Poulton district of Wallasey with the north end of Birkenhead, Duke Street bridge is also a bascule (see-saw) bridge but with painted green girders. Originally, it was also a swing bridge.

Furthest upstream is the Penny Bridge, which crosses the head of the pool to connect Poulton with Bidston in Birkenhead. Replacing an earlier wooden bridge of 1843, the name derives from the 1896 one penny toll to cross in one direction. The bridge was replaced again in 1926 and provided access to Bidston Dock. The bridge was replaced by a new swing bridge in 1996 but since the dock itself has been filled in the mechanism has fallen into disrepair through lack of use and the bridge is now effectively a static structure.

2017 should have seen both of the bridges on Tower Road replaced. The south bridge will be replaced with a modern, flat-deck fixed concrete slab whilst the north bridge will be replaced with a lifting bridge powered by hydraulic rams. Work was expected to be completed by November 2017 but, due to complications, the bridge was not reopened until 28 June 2018.

Central Hydraulic Tower and Engine House

Jesse Hartley, who was responsible for many of Liverpool's maritime structures – including the Albert Dock, designed the Central Hydraulic Tower and Engine House (the tower is an accumulator tower). Providing power for the movement of lock gates and bridges at Birkenhead Docks, it was completed in 1863. The design of the building was based on the Palazzo Vecchio in the Piazza Della Signoria, Florence, Italy. In March 2021, it was announced that the building would be brought back in to use as a maritime knowledge hub and will be a national base for marine engineering research and development and survival training as well as providing business accelerator space for the maritime sector. The project will cost £23m.

Wirral Waters
Peel Holdings announced on 6 September 2006 the Wirral Waters project. This would allow for a £4.5bn of investment in the regeneration of the dockland area. This equates with an investment of over £14,000 for each of the 320,000 population of Wirral. A retail and leisure quarter at the former Bidston Dock site would encompass another  of space. The whole project is estimated to create over 27,000 permanent new jobs, aside from the employment required for construction and other peripheral employment.

The Wirral Waters Baseline Study of July 2008 has been endorsed by Wirral Borough Council. In February 2009 the first stage of the planning application for the first major mixed use development masterplan/quarter was submitted. The development would be expected to take up to 30 years.

References

Sources

Further reading

External links

 
 Aerial photo
 Wirral Waters official site
 Information on future plans for Birkenhead Docks by Wirral Waters

Birkenhead docks
Maritime Transport in Merseyside